James Richard Baird (born June 4, 1945) is an American businessman and politician who serves as the U.S. representative from Indiana's . Before being elected to Congress, Baird served from 2010 to 2018 as a member of the Indiana House of Representatives and as a Putnam County commissioner from 2006 to 2010. A Vietnam veteran, Baird was elected to Congress on November 6, 2018.

Early life and education
Baird graduated from Turkey Run High School in 1963, participating in 4-H and Future Farmers of America. He obtained a Bachelor of Science in animal science from Purdue University in 1967 and a Master's of Science in animal science from Purdue in 1969. After the Vietnam War, Baird earned a PhD in animal science monogastric nutrition from the University of Kentucky in 1975.

Military service
Baird served in the ROTC at Purdue University from 1963 to 1965. He attended the Officer Candidate School Class 2–70 at Fort Benning and Jungle Warfare School in Panama from 1969 to 1970, and was commissioned in the Infantry. The United States Army was sending infantry divisions home when Second Lieutenant Baird arrived in Vietnam in 1970. Because of the excess of Infantry officers, he was assigned to the 523rd Transportation Company (Light Truck) at Cha Rang Valley. Baird and the other officers were highly respected by the men because they shared the same risks and burdens.

The truck companies of the 8th Transportation Group delivered cargo along the most heavily ambushed road in Vietnam, QL19, through the Central Highlands in northern II Corps Tactical Zone. The 523rd had five 5-ton gun trucks at the time. The Group Commander considered the 523rd his best truck company and when instructed to send two light truck companies north to I Corps Tactical Zone for the upcoming Laotian Incursion, Operation Lam Son 719, in February through April 1971, he chose to send his best. The 523rd was attached to the 39th Transportation Battalion and stationed at the abandoned Marine Corps base Camp Vandergrift. During the two-and-a-half-month incursion into Laos, the North Vietnamese Army tried to close down the supply route with 23 convoy ambushes. Baird fought in two of the operation's deadliest ambushes and lost his left arm during the convoy ambush on March 12, 1971. He earned a Bronze Star and two Purple Hearts. In 2012, the 523rd Transportation Company was inducted into the Transportation Corps Hall of Fame for its heroism during Operation Lam Son 719.

Baird was fondly nicknamed "pig farmer" by fellow infantrymen because of his passion for breeding pigs.

Badges, medals, and ribbons
Combat Infantry Badge
Bronze Star with valor “V” device
Purple Heart with Oak Leaf Cluster
Vietnam Service Medal
Army Commendation Medal with valor “V” device
National Defense Service Medal
Meritorious Unit Commendation
Vietnam Campaign Medal with 60 Device
Vietnam Cross of Gallantry with Palm for valorous combat achievement
Vietnam Civil Actions Medal
Expert Rifleman
Jungle Expert Badge

Career
Baird is the owner and operator of Baird Family Farms and Indiana Home Care Plus. He previously worked as an animal nutritionist at Landmark Cooperative, a feed manufacturer, as director of sales and nutrition at Agmax, and as a livestock specialist for Purdue University Cooperative Extension Service.

Baird ran for Putnam County commissioner in 2006 and defeated the incumbent, Dennis O'Hair, in the primary. He represented Marion Township, Greencastle Township, Madison Township, and Clinton Township. He served as commissioner for the second district until his election to the State House in 2010. He was succeeded by Nancy Fogle. The American Conservative Union gave him a lifetime legislative evaluation of 82% in 2017.

Indiana House of Representatives
Baird represented House District 44, including Putnam County and portions of Clay, Morgan, Owen, and Parke counties, from 2010 until 2018. He served as a member of the Ways and Means Committee—chairing the Health and Medicaid Subcommittee—the Agriculture and Rural Development Committee, Veteran Affairs and Public Safety, the Environmental Affairs Committee, and the Statutory Committee on Ethics.

U.S. House of Representatives

Elections

2018

Baird ran for Indiana's 4th congressional district in 2018. The seat was vacated by Todd Rokita in his unsuccessful run for U.S. Senate. Baird won the May 8 Republican primary and the November 6 general election.

2020

Baird was reelected in 2020 with 66.6% of the vote.

2022

Baird was reelected in 2022 with 68.2% of the vote.

Tenure
Baird was the second-oldest member of the 116th Congress freshman class, after Democrat Donna Shalala, who was born in 1941.

In December 2020, Baird was one of 126 Republican members of the House of Representatives to sign an amicus brief in support of Texas v. Pennsylvania, a lawsuit filed at the United States Supreme Court contesting the results of the 2020 presidential election, in which Joe Biden defeated incumbent Donald Trump. The Supreme Court declined to hear the case on the basis that Texas lacked standing under Article III of the Constitution to challenge the results of an election held by another state.

Committee assignments
Committee on Agriculture
Subcommittee on Conservation, Biotechnology & Research, Chair
Subcommittee on Livestock, Dairy & Poultry
Committee on Foreign Affairs
Subcommittee on Africa
Subcommittee on Middle East, North Africa & Central Asia
Committee on Science, Space, and Technology
Subcommittee on Environment
Subcommittee on Research and Technology (Ranking Member, 116th Congress)

Caucus membership 
Congressional Western Caucus
Republican Study Committee

Electoral history

Personal life
Baird's son, Beau, was elected chair of the Putnam County Republican Party in March 2017. Beau ran to replace him in the Indiana House of Representatives. Beau won the election on November 6, 2018.

Baird resides in Greencastle. Baird has attended Gobin United Methodist Church in Greencastle since 1975.

References

External links
Congressman Jim Baird official U.S. House website
Campaign website

James Baird at Ballotpedia
Our Campaigns – Representative James Baird (IN) profile

|-

|-

|-

1945 births
Living people
American amputees
United States Army personnel of the Vietnam War
American politicians with disabilities
County commissioners in Indiana
21st-century American politicians
Republican Party members of the Indiana House of Representatives
People from Greencastle, Indiana
Purdue University College of Agriculture alumni
University of Kentucky alumni
United States Army officers
Republican Party members of the United States House of Representatives from Indiana